Dante R. Basco (born August 29, 1975) is an American film, television and voice actor. He is best known for his role as Rufio, the leader of the Lost Boys in Steven Spielberg's Hook and for voicing the titular character on American Dragon: Jake Long and Zuko on Avatar: The Last Airbender, Julian Lee in Fakin' da Funk, and for his many voice acting roles, most notably as Zuko's grandson: Iroh II, in The Legend of Korra, Shingo in EA's Skate, Fukushima in Kim Possible, Kwok Wong in The Proud Family, Jingmei in The Boondocks, Kenny Rodgers in Firebreather, Tuck in Generator Rex, Scorpion in Ultimate Spider-Man, Jai Kell in Star Wars Rebels, Cheddar in We Bare Bears, Javier in Victor and Valentino, and Spin Kick from Carmen Sandiego.

Early life
Basco was born in Pittsburg, California, and raised in Cerritos and Paramount, California. He has four siblings, including actor Dion Basco. In Dante's early years, he was part of the Street Freaks breakdancing crew with his brothers. He attended Orange County High School of the Arts in the Music and Theatre Conservatory and graduated in 1993.

Career 
He got into acting taking on minor roles in television. Basco's breakout performance was when he appeared as the leader Rufio of the Lost Boys in Steven Spielberg's 1991 film Hook with Robin Williams and Dustin Hoffman.

In June 2017, he agreed with Jonah Feingold to work on a new film together, Bangarang, about the character Rufio. The development of the project started with a Kickstarter campaign.

Basco streams gameplay on Twitch.

Basco released his memoir From Rufio to Zuko through the independent publisher Not a Cult.

Avatar: Braving the Elements, an official Nickelodeon companion podcast to Avatar: The Last Airbender, premiered on June 22, 2021, hosted by Basco and Janet Varney. The podcast is an episode-by-episode deep dive into the Avatarverse with special guest appearances.

Voice acting 

Basco has done voice acting for many animated productions, including Zuko in Avatar: The Last Airbender, Jai Kell in Star Wars Rebels and Jake Long in American Dragon: Jake Long. He also voice acted Kwok Wong in The Proud Family. He voiced Matt Martin/Kewl Breeze in the short-lived animated series Zevo-3. He also voiced General Iroh, Zuko's grandson, in The Legend of Korra.

He contributed additional voices for Aion, Mortal Kombat X and Saints Row. He also voiced Shingo in the Skate series and Seeing Farther in the Call of Juarez series.

Filmography

Film

Television

Web series

Video games

Awards
 Young Artist Award – Hook
 Won – Best Ensemble Cast
 Nominated – Best Young Actor

See also
 List of Filipino Americans

References

External links

1975 births
American male film actors
American male television actors
American male child actors
American male voice actors
American male video game actors
American male actors of Filipino descent
Living people
People from Pittsburg, California
20th-century American male actors
21st-century American male actors
Orange County School of the Arts alumni